Puntius is a genus of small freshwater fish in the family Cyprinidae native to South Asia and Mainland Southeast Asia, as well as Taiwan.

Many species formerly placed in Puntius have been moved to other genera such as Barbodes, Dawkinsia, Desmopuntius, Haludaria, Oliotius, Pethia, Puntigrus, Sahyadria and Systomus.

Etymology

The name Puntius comes from Pungti (Pronounced Puti), a Bangla term for small cyprinids.

Range
Fishes of the genus Puntius are found in South Asia (west to Pakistan and south to Sri Lanka) and Mainland Southeast Asia, with a single species, P. snyderi, in Taiwan. The greatest species richness is in India.

Description

In appearance they may resemble miniature carp and are sometimes brightly coloured or patterned.

Behavior
These fishes are omnivorous; their diet includes small invertebrates and plant matter. Breeding is by egg scattering and takes place close to the bottom, near or within areas of dense plant growth. They do not show parental care and adults may eat the young.

Taxonomy
Historically, many species of Puntius have been classified in several genera, including Barbus. Despite the reclassifications, the specific epithet remains the same in these – except in cases of homonymies – as Barbus and Puntius have the same grammatical gender. The closest living relatives of the spotted barbs are the genus Cyprinion and perhaps the genus Capoeta. These and the other "typical" barbs and barbels were formerly often separated as subfamily Barbinae, but this group is highly paraphyletic with regard to the Cyprininae and better merged there at least for the largest part (including Puntius). In particular the genus Barbonymus, containing the tinfoil barb and its relatives – for some time included in Puntius – appears to be a kind of carp that has evolved convergently with barbs.

Species
These are the currently recognized species in this genus:

 Puntius ambassis (F. Day, 1869)
 Puntius amphibius (Valenciennes, 1842) (Scarlet-banded barb)
 Puntius aphya (Günther, 1868)
 Puntius arenatus (F. Day, 1878) (Arenatus barb)
 Puntius bimaculatus (Bleeker, 1863) (Redside barb)
 Puntius bramoides (Valenciennes, 1842)
 Puntius brevis (Bleeker, 1849)
 Puntius burmanicus (F. Day, 1878)
 Puntius cauveriensis (Hora, 1937) (Cauvery barb)
 Puntius chola (F. Hamilton, 1822) (Swamp barb)
 Puntius crescentus G. M. Yazdani & D. F. Singh, 1994
 Puntius deccanensis G. M. Yazdani & M. Babu Rao, 1976 (Deccan barb)
 Puntius dolichopterus  Plamoottil, 2015  (Longfin Kerala barb)
 Puntius dorsalis (Jerdon, 1849) (Long-snouted barb)
 Puntius euspilurus Plamoottil 2016
 Puntius fraseri (Hora & Misra, 1938) (Dharna barb)
 Puntius kamalika N. K. A. Silva, Maduwage & Pethiyagoda, 2008
 Puntius kelumi Pethiyagoda, N. K. A. Silva, Maduwage & Meegaskumbura, 2008
 Puntius khohi Dobriyal, R. Singh, S. P. Uniyal, H. K. Joshi, S. Phurailatpam & M. S. Bisht, 2004
 Puntius kyphus Plamootitl, 2019
 Puntius layardi (Günther, 1868)
 Puntius madhusoodani Krishna Kumar, Benno Pereira & Radhakrishnan, 2012 
 Puntius mahecola (Valenciennes, 1844) (Mahecola barb) 
 Puntius masyai H. M. Smith, 1945
 Puntius melanostigma F. Day, 1878
 Puntius morehensis Arunkumar & Tombi Singh, 1998
 Puntius mudumalaiensis Menon & Rema Devi, 1992
 Puntius muzaffarpurensis Srivastava, K. P. Verma & R. B. Sharma, 1977
 Puntius nangalensis Jayaram, 1990
 Puntius nelsoni Plamoottil, 2014 (Travancore yellow barb)
 Puntius nigronotus Plamoottil, 2014  (Malabar black-backed barb)
 Puntius ocellus Plamoottil & Vineeth, 2020
 Puntius parrah F. Day, 1865 (Parrah barb)
 Puntius paucimaculatus Y. H. Wang & Y. Ni, 1982
 Puntius pugio S. O. Kullander, 2008
 Puntius punjabensis (F. Day, 1871) 
 Puntius puntio (F. Hamilton, 1822) (Puntio barb)
 Puntius sahyadriensis Silas, 1953 (Khavli barb)
 Puntius sanctus Plamoottil 2020
 Puntius sealei (Herre, 1933)
 Puntius somphongsi (Benl & Klausewitz, 1962)
 Puntius sophore (F. Hamilton, 1822) (Pool barb)
 Puntius sophoroides (Günther, 1868)
 Puntius spilopterus (Fowler, 1934)
 Puntius takhoaensis Nguyen & Doan, 1969)
 Puntius terio (F. Hamilton, 1822) (Onespot barb)
 Puntius tetraspilus Günther, 1868)
 Puntius thermalis Valenciennes, 1844)
 Puntius titteya Deraniyagala, 1929 (Cherry barb)
 Puntius viridis Plamoottil & Abraham, 2014  (Spotfin green barb)
 Puntius vittatus F. Day, 1865 (Greenstripe barb)
 Puntius waageni (F. Day, 1872)

References

 
 
Cyprinidae genera
Fish of Southeast Asia
Fish of South Asia
Taxa named by Francis Buchanan-Hamilton